The National Commission for Women (NCW) is the statutory body of the Government of India, generally concerned with advising the government on all policy matters affecting women. It was established on 31 January 1992 under the provisions of the Indian Constitution, as defined in the 1990 National Commission for Women Act. The first head of the commission was Jayanti Patnaik. As of 30 November 2018, Rekha Sharma is the chairperson.

Activities
The objective of the NCW is to represent the rights of women in India and to provide a voice for their issues and concerns. The subjects of their campaigns have included dowry, politics, religion, equal representation for women in jobs, and the exploitation of women for labour. They have also discussed police abuses against women.

The commission regularly publishes a monthly newsletter, Rashtra Mahila, in both Hindi and English.

Controversies

Section 497 of the Indian Penal Code
In December 2006 and January 2007, the NCW found itself at the center of a minor controversy over its insistence that Section 497 of the Indian Penal Code not be changed to make adulterous wives equally prosecutable by their husbands.

But the grounds on which Ms. Vyas resists the logic of making this a criminal offence — particularly for women, as often recommended — are not as encouraging. She is averse to holding the adulterous woman equally culpable as the adulterous man because women, she believes, are never offenders. They are always the victims.

The NCW has demanded that women should not be punished for adultery, as a woman is "the victim and not an offender" in such cases. They have also advocated the amendment of Section 198 of the CrPC to allow women to file complaints against unfaithful husbands and prosecute them for their promiscuous behaviour. This was in response to "loopholes" in the Indian Penal Code that allowed men to file adultery charges against other men who have engaged in illicit relations but did not allow women to file charges against their husbands.

The Commission has also worked to guarantee women security in unconventional relationships.

Mangalore pub attack controversy

The NCW came under sharp criticism for their response to the attack by forty male members of the Hindu right-wing Sri Ram Sena on eight women in a bar in Mangalore in late January 2009.  Video from the attack shows the women were punched, pulled by their hair, and thrown out of the pub.

NCW member Nirmala Venkatesh was sent to assess the situation, and said in an interview that the pub did not have adequate security and that the women should have protected themselves. Venkatesh said, "If the girls feel they were not doing anything wrong why are they afraid to come forward and give a statement?" On 6 February, the NCW said they decided not to accept Venkatesh's report but would not be sending a new team to Mangalore. On 27 February, the Prime Minister's Office approved the removal of Nirmala Venkatesh on disciplinary grounds.

Guwahati molestation controversy

The NCW came under fire again after the molestation of a 17-year-old girl by a gang of men outside a pub in Guwahati on 9 July 2012. NCW member Alka Lamba was accused of leaking the name of the minor victim to the media, and was subsequently removed from the fact-finding committee, though she remains a member of the commission. The following week, NCW chairperson Mamta Sharma made comments suggesting that women "be careful how you dress", which invited criticism that she was guilty of victim blaming. The controversy led activists to call for a restructuring of the commission.

Badaun rape and murder controversy 
In 2021, the NCW was once again criticized for engaging in victim blaming following the gang rape and murder of a woman in Badaun, Uttar Pradesh. A two-member delegation from the NCW was sent to the site of the incident to meet with the victim's family and prepare a fact-finding report. NCW member Chandramukhi Devi, who was part of the delegation, stated to the press that part of the blame for the incident lay with the victim, as she had chosen to visit the temple late in the evening. Devi stated, "A woman should not go out at odd hours under the influence of somebody. I think if she had not gone out in the evening, or had some child along with her, this could have been prevented." The comments attracted wide criticism on social media, as well as from celebrities. Following public criticism, Devi withdrew her remarks.

Chairpersons

State Level Women Commission 

Following is the list of state level women commissions

See also 

 Domestic violence in India
 Dowry system in India
 Female foeticide in India
 Feminism in India
 Gender inequality in India
 Gender pay gap in India
 Men's rights movement in India
 Rape in India
 Welfare schemes for women in India
 Women in India
 Women in Indian Armed Forces
 Women's Reservation Bill
 Women's suffrage in India

References

External links
 The National Commission for Women, India, official website

Commissions in India
Indian commissions and inquiries
Women's rights in India
1992 establishments in Delhi
Women's organisations based in India
Government agencies established in 1992